Kensett Township may refer to:

 Kensett Township, White County, Arkansas, in White County, Arkansas
 Kensett Township, Worth County, Iowa

Township name disambiguation pages